The plantain squirrel, oriental squirrel or tricoloured squirrel (Callosciurus notatus) is a species of rodent in the family Sciuridae found in Indonesia, Malaysia, Singapore, and Thailand in a wide range of habitats: forests, mangroves, parks, gardens, and agricultural areas. Fruit farmers consider them to be pests.

Description
It is greyish/brown with a chestnut belly and a black and white stripe on the side. It is very quick and agile in trees,  able to jump a few metres between trees, and rarely wanders on the ground.

Diet
Its diet consists mostly of leaves and fruits, but it also eats insects and bird eggs. It is known to break open twigs that contain ant larvae to eat them. It can eat fruits much bigger than itself, such as mangoes, jackfruit, or coconuts.

Taxonomy
The genus name Callosciurus means "beautiful squirrel". Kloss's squirrel (Callosciurus albescens) is sometimes considered a subspecies.

References

External links
http://www.ecologyasia.com/verts/mammals/plantain_squirrel.htm
https://web.archive.org/web/20110716084244/http://www.wildsingapore.per.sg/discovery/factsheet/squirrelplantain.htm

notatus
Rodents of Indonesia
Rodents of Malaysia
Rodents of Singapore
Rodents of Thailand
Mammals described in 1785
Taxonomy articles created by Polbot